Baba Ramdev (or Ramdevji, or Ramdeo Pir, Ramsha Pir (1352–1385 AD; V.S. 1409–1442) is a Hindu  deity of Gujarat and Rajasthan, India. He was a fourteenth-century ruler, said to have miraculous powers, who devoted his life uplifting the downtrodden and poor people. He is worshiped by many social groups of India as Ishta-deva.

Background

King Ajmal (Ajmal tanwar) married Queen Minaldevi, daughter of Pamji Bhati of Chhahan Baru village. The sonless king went to Dwaraka and pleaded with Krishna about his wish to have a child like him. They had two sons, the elder Viramdev and the younger Ramdev. Ramdev was born on Bhadra Shukla Dooj in V.S. 1409 in a Rajput family at Ramderiya. Barmer district.

Ramdev believed in the equality of all human beings, be they high or low, rich or poor. He helped the down-trodden by granting them their wishes. He is often depicted on horseback. His followers are spread across in Rajasthan, Haryana, Punjab, Gujarat and Madhya Pradesh, Mumbai, Delhi and also in Sindh in Pakistan. Several fairs in Rajasthan are held to commemorate him. Temples in his name are found in many states of India.

Story of King Ajmal

Ajmal arrived at Dwarka and prayed for many days. Ultimately, in sheer disappointment, he asked Krishna's image the reason for deserving such sorrow. The image did not respond to the king's repeated queries. Angered and enraged at this, the king threw a dried laddu at the head of the image. The priest of the temple, considering the king to be mad, asked the king to go to the mystic Dwaraka to speak to the Lord. Dwaraka, swallowed by the sea many centuries prior, lay on the bed of the Arabian Sea. The unfearing king dived into the sea to meet the Lord. Pleased at the king's dedication and faith, the Lord granted him a boon. The king asked for Krishna to be born as his son. Lord promised to come in the king's house. Soon thereafter, the royal couple gave birth to the boy, whom they named Bhiramdev. After a few years, Krishna took a small form and appeared next to Bhiramdev. Muslims venerate Ramdev as Ramshah Pir or Rama Shah Peer. He was said to have had miraculous powers and his fame reached far and wide. Legend has it that five Pirs from Mecca came to test Ramdev's powers. Ramdev welcomed them, and requested them to have lunch with him. The Pirs declined, saying that they ate only with their personal utensils, which were in Mecca. At this, Ramdev smiled and said look your utensils are coming and they saw that their eating bowls were coming flying in air from Mecca. After being convinced of his abilities and powers, they paid their homage to him and named him Rama Shah Peer. The five Pirs, who came to test his powers, were so impressed by him that they decided to stay with him. Their graves are located near Ramdev's samadhi.

Samadhi and Main Temple in Ramdevra

Ramdev took Samadhi at Ramdevra (10 km from Pokhran) in Rajasthan, on Bhadrapada Shukla Ekadashi in V.S. 1442 at the age of 33 years.

The temple complex housing the resting place of Ramdev is located at Ramdevra (10 km from Pokhran) in Rajasthan. The present temple structure was built around Ramdev's final resting place by Maharaja Ganga Singh of Bikaner in 1931.

The complex also houses Samadhis of his disciples like Dalibai and some other of his chief disciples. The complex also houses the tombs of five Muslim Pirs, who had come from Mecca. It also houses a step-well, the water of which devotees believe has healing powers.

Ramdev Jayanti

Ramdev Jayanti, the birth date of Ramdev, is celebrated every year in India by his devotees. It falls on Dooj (the second day) of Shukla paksha of Bhadrapad month of Hindu calendar. In Rajasthan, this day is observed as a public holiday and a fair is held at the Ramdevra temple, where hundreds of thousands of devotees, both Hindu and Muslim, take part and pay their homage to Samadhi at the main temple.

Shri Ramdev pir temple, Pakistan

The Temple of Rama Pir is located in Tando Allahyar, Sindh, Pakistan. The annual festival of Ramapir Temple Tando Allahyar is the second largest pilgrimage sites for the Hindus in Pakistan. Every year in the Hindu month of Bhadrapad, 3 days celebrations are arranged by Ramapir Sheva Mandli.

See also 
 Ramdevra
 Khatushyamji

References

External links 

 

14th-century monarchs in Asia
Dargahs in India
Folk deities of Rajasthan
Hinduism and Islam
Regional Hindu gods
Sufi shrines in India